{{DISPLAYTITLE:C16H20N2}}
The molecular formula C16H20N2 may refer to:

 Benzathine
 Costaclavin
 DALT
 Festuclavine
 Pheniramine
 3,3',5,5'-Tetramethylbenzidine (TMB)

Molecular formulas